Chishili (Dargwa: ЧӀишили) is a rural locality (a selo) in Dakhadayevsky District, Republic of Dagestan, Russia. The population was 551 as of 2010.

Geography 
Chishili is located 5 km southeast of Urkarakh (the district's administrative centre) by road. Urkarakh and Buskri are the nearest rural localities.

Nationalities 
Dargins live there.

References 

Rural localities in Dakhadayevsky District